The Alpha Michigan Brewing Company (AMBC) is a nanobrewery in the village of Alpha in the Upper Peninsula of Michigan.

History 
The Alpha Michigan Brewing Company opened in May 2018. The business was started by Stu and Julie Creel.  When it first opened, the brewery was owned by Mike and Mary Bjork, both from Alpha, and Stu and Julie Creel from nearby Crystal Falls. The establishment describes Alpha as "the smallest village in America with a brewery". In 2019, the brewery ran out of beer after above-normal sales during the US Independence Day holiday.

The brewery's beer names are all related to Alpha, its former Porter school, nearby Mastodon Township, or Iron County, the county of Alpha and Mastodon Township. Its business is also heavily locally focused. For example, during the 2020 COVID-19 pandemic in the United States, the brewery donated US$200 plus 20% of their Saturday beer sales to three nearby St. Vincent de Paul locations. In early 2021, the brewery added outdoor heated tents to expand its COVID-appropriate seating. The funds to purchase them came from a Michigan weatherization grant program. In the following year, the company hosted an "Ice Bowl" winter disc golf competition to benefit a local food bank, and brewed a pilsner beer to support Ukraine during the Russian invasion of that country.

Location 
The brewery is at 303 E. Center St. in a former bus garage that is attached to Alpha's long-closed George F. Porter Public School. The school building is listed on the US National Register of Historic Places as part of the Alpha Public Buildings Historic Complex, all on a single block. The Porter School was last used as a school in 1967 and sold by the village in 2005.

The interior of the taproom was partially constructed from secondhand materials gathered from around the village. Its bar was previously used for a buffet at the Alpha Inn and at the Alpha Veterans of Foreign Wars, changing hands when the locations closed, and a pew from the shuttered St. Edwards Catholic Church in Alpha is part of the brewery's available seats.

See also 
 Blackrocks Brewery
 Keweenaw Brewing Company
 Ore Dock Brewing Company

Endnotes

External links 
Official website
Facebook page

2018 establishments in Michigan
Companies based in Alpha, Michigan
Beer brewing companies based in the Upper Peninsula of Michigan
American companies established in 2018
Food and drink companies established in 2018